Post-tetanic potentiation (PTP) is a form of synaptic plasticity which is short-lived and results in increased frequency of miniature excitatory postsynaptic potentials (mEPSPs) or currents (EPSCs) with no effect on amplitude in the spontaneous postsynaptic potential.  It usually lasts in the range of several minutes (shorter potentiations are usually referred to as 'augmentations').  PTPs are observed when synapses are stimulated with repetitive (tetanic) pulses, by means of  prolonged trains of stimuli applied at high frequencies (10 Hz to 200 Hz stimuli applied for .2 seconds to 5 seconds).

PTPs are thought to result primarily from the buildup of calcium concentration in the axon terminal of the presynaptic neuron during the stimulus train. However, this is a topic under debate as changes that last this long outlive the rate at which calcium is transported out of the presynaptic neuron.

In some cases, depression can be observed instead of potentiation following the tetanic stimulus.

See also
 Long-term potentiation

References

Neuroplasticity